Sambho Siva Sambho is a 2010 Indian Telugu-language action drama film directed by Samuthirakani. It stars Ravi Teja, Allari Naresh, Siva Balaji, Priyamani, Abhinaya, and Surya Teja. This film is a remake of the director's 2009 film Naadodigal. The film released on 14 January 2010 to mixed responses from critics. Despite mixed reviews, the film performed well as the audience gave a thumbs up and was declared a box office hit. The film was later dubbed in Hindi as Mera Krodh in 2012.

Plot
Karunakar alias Karna (Ravi Teja), Malli (Allari Naresh), and Chandu (Siva Balaji) are close friends, and each of them has individual goals. Karna is in love with his cross-cousin Muniamma (Priyamani), whose father wants him to get a government job first. Malli dreams of going to a foreign land as soon as Karna gets his passport. Chandu aims to set up a computer training center and is in love with Karunakar’s sister Pavithra (Abhinaya). The trio enjoys life, hanging out together. Karunakar’s friend Santosh (Surya Teja), the son of the Home Minister (Roja), is in love with his family’s arch rival's daughter. The three friends come forward to unite these lovebirds against all odds. In the process, a charge sheet is filed against the trio and Karunakar loses his government job offer and his grandmother is killed by henchmen and the alliance with his love is called off by muniamma's father after both the family's clash, Malli loses his hearing, and Chandu has his leg amputated. 10 days later,due to ego clashes ,the married lovers hate each other and walk out. The friends, who sacrificed and lost everything to unite these lovers now are hellbent for their blood, but in the end , instead of ending them ,karunakar lectures them and considers them already dead before the friends leave them to their own fate.

Cast

Development

The film is an official remake of Samuthirakani's own Tamil Film Naadodigal. This film's title is based on Naadodigal's hit song Sambho Siva Sambho.

Soundtrack
The music was composed by Sundar C. Babu and released by Aditya Music.

Critical reception

The film received mixed to positive reviews from critics. Sify rated 4/5 and gave it the verdict "entertaining". Supergoodmovies rated it 3/5 and said " All artists gave their best performances and though being his debut direction, Samuthirakarni deserves a hit".

References

External links

2010s Telugu-language films
2010 action drama films
2010s buddy films
Telugu remakes of Tamil films
2010 films
Indian buddy films
Indian action drama films
Films directed by Samuthirakani
Films scored by Sundar C. Babu
2010 action films
2000s action drama films
2000s buddy films
Films set in Andhra Pradesh
Films shot in Andhra Pradesh
Films set in Konaseema
Films shot in Rajahmundry